Peerapong Pichitchotirat (born June 28, 1984), is a Thai retired professional footballer who plays as an midfielder He is current first-team coach of Thai League 1 club BG Pathum United.

Club career
He played for Krung Thai Bank in the 2008 AFC Champions League group stage.

Honours

Clubs
Bangkok Glass/BG Pathum United
Thai League 1 (1): 2020–21
Thai FA Cup (1): 2014
Queen's Cup (1): 2010
Singapore Cup (1): 2010

Chiangrai United
Thai League 1 (1): 2019

References

External links
 
 Profile at Goal
 P. Pichitchotirat at Soccerway

1984 births
Living people
Peerapong Pichitchotirat
Peerapong Pichitchotirat
Association football midfielders
Peerapong Pichitchotirat
Peerapong Pichitchotirat
Peerapong Pichitchotirat